Kreis Filehne was a district in Regierungsbezirk Bromberg, in the Prussian Province of Posen from 1887 to 1920.

History 
On October 1, 1887, the new Filehne district was formed from the western part of the Czarnikau district as part of a major district reform in the province of Posen. The capital of the new district was Filehne.

As a result of the Treaty of Versailles, the district was dissolved and divided on January 10, 1920. The area south of the Netze river became part of Poland. The area north of the river remained in Germany and became part of the Netzekreis in the province of Posen-West Prussia.

Demographics 
According to the Prussian census of 1905, the district had a population of 32,669, of which 72% were Germans and 28% were Poles.

Table of Standesämter
"Standesamt" is the German name of the local civil registration offices which were established in October 1874 soon after the German Empire was formed. Births, marriages and deaths were recorded. Previously, only the church records were used for Christians.

References

Districts of the Province of Posen
1887 establishments in Germany
1920 disestablishments in Germany